Camroden Presbyterian Church is a historic Presbyterian church in Floyd, Oneida County, New York.  It was built in 1863–1864 and is a rectangular timber framed, gable roofed building measuring 43 by 32 feet.  It features vernacular Greek Revival details.

It was listed on the National Register of Historic Places in 2007.

References

External links

Presbyterian churches in New York (state)
Churches on the National Register of Historic Places in New York (state)
Churches in Oneida County, New York
National Register of Historic Places in Oneida County, New York